Liechtenstein competed at the 1988 Summer Olympics in Seoul, South Korea. Twelve competitors, nine men and three women, took part in fifteen events in five sports.

Competitors
The following is the list of number of competitors in the Games.

Athletics

Men's 100 metres
 Markus Büchel
 Heat — 11.21 (→ did not advance)

Men's 200 metres
 Markus Büchel
 Heat — 22.02 (→ did not advance)

Women's Heptathlon 
 Yvonne Hasler
 Final Result — did not start (→ no ranking)

Women's 100 m Hurdles
 Manuela Marxer
 Heat — 14.38 (→ did not advance)

Cycling

Three cyclists, two men and one woman, represented Liechtenstein in 1988.

Men's road race
 Peter Hermann Final — 4:32:56 (→ 54th place)
 Patrick Matt Final — did not finish (→ no ranking)

Men's 1 km time trial
 Peter Hermann Final — ?? (→ 21st place)

Men's individual pursuit
 Patrick Matt Final — ?? (→ 18th place)

Men's points race
 Peter Hermann Qualification — did not qualify (→ 25th place)

Women's road race
 Yvonne Elkuch — 2:00:52 (→ 17th place)

Equestrian

 Thomas Batliner

Judo

Men's Competition
 Daniel Brunhart
 Magnus Büchel
 Arnold Frick
 Johannes Wohlwend
Final Result -71 kg (→ 7th place)

Shooting

Men's Competition
 Gilbert Kaiser

References

External links
Official Olympic Reports

Nations at the 1988 Summer Olympics
1988
1988 in Liechtenstein